We Are the Mess is the second studio album by German metalcore band Electric Callboy (formerly Eskimo Callboy). The album was released on January 10, 2014 through Redfield Records. The album was entirely produced by Kristian Kohlmannslehner. It features two guest appearances on the album, including BastiBasti of Callejon and former Hollywood Undead singer Deuce on the track "Jagger Swagger".

Track listing

Charts

Personnel 
 Sebastian "Sushi" Biesler – vocals
 Kevin Ratajczak – vocals, keyboards
 Daniel Haniß – guitar
 Pascal Schillo – guitar
 Daniel Klossek – bass guitar
 David Friedrich – drums

Additional personnel
 Deuce – additional vocals on "Jagger Swagger"
 BastiBasti (Callejon) – additional performer on "Jagger Swagger"
 Kristian Kohlmannslehner – producer

References 

2014 albums
Electric Callboy albums